Amish (also known locally as Joetown) is an unincorporated community in Johnson County, Iowa, United States. It is part of the Iowa City Metropolitan Statistical Area. Its altitude is 758 feet (231 m), and it lies at  (41.5358477, −91.7865601).

History
Amish's population was 64 in 1902, and 75 in 1925.

References

Unincorporated communities in Iowa
Unincorporated communities in Johnson County, Iowa
Iowa City metropolitan area